Claire Keelan (born 8 May 1975) is an English actress. She played Claire Ashcroft in Nathan Barley and Electroclash in No Heroics.

Background
Keelan is a former member of the Royal Court Young People's Theatre. She trained at Westminster College between 1998 and 1999.

Career
Keelan has appeared in the films A Cock and Bull Story (2005), Pierrepoint (2005) and Hush (2009). Her television credits include Perfect Day, Survivors, Sorted, Moving On, The Trip, and the pilot episode of How Not to Live Your Life. She played the lead roles of Claire Ashcroft in Nathan Barley and Electroclash in No Heroics. In 2013 she appeared in an episode of Channel 4's Black Mirror written by Charlie Brooker.

Keelan's theatre work includes Top Girls, Ultra Violet, Les liaisons dangereuses, A Midsummer Night's Dream, Rise and Shine and The Electric Hills.

Filmography

Television

Film

References

External links
 

English television actresses
English film actresses
English stage actresses
21st-century English actresses
Living people
1975 births